L’Espace Francophone pour la Recherche, le Développement et l'Innovation, or the Francophone Area for Research, Development and Innovation  is an international research consortium  strengthening collaboration between North-South researchers and experts founded in 2008.

Mission
The primary mission of EFRARD is strengthening collaboration between North-South researchers and experts in Francophone countries.
Provide a new model of collaboration and socialization, facilitating interactions with exterior organizations and individuals.
Break down geographical barriers as well as the institutional and economic impediments to the free flow of knowledge, know-how and technology within communities.
Reduce the north-south gap through a digital apparatus promoting sharing and cooperation in research and development areas among Francophone countries.

Members
The official list of members is available at the website.

Grand Forum Francophone Pour la Recherche et l'Innovation 

 Annual Strategic Conference

See also 
 Agence de coopération culturelle et technique
 Conseil international de la langue française
 French immersion
 Journée internationale de la Francophonie

References

External links
 Cabinet du Secrétaire d'Etat chargé de la coopération et de la francophonie
 Ministère des affaires étrangères
 UNESCO
 La Francophonie Website
 Agence intergouvernementale de la Francophonie
 History of the Summits
 Information about the Francophonie
 TV-francophone

Organisation internationale de la Francophonie
Francophonie
Organizations based in Paris
2008 establishments in France
Organizations established in 2008
University of Paris 8 Vincennes-Saint-Denis